Loch Beanie also known as Loch Shechernich, is a small shallow freshwater loch that is located in Glen Shee in Perth and Kinross, Scotland.

Island
At the centre of the island, roughly 100 metres from the southern shore is a Crannog that is constructed of boulders and small stones. Less than a third of the surface of the island is visible above water.

A building perhaps once existed on the loch. In a map by Timothy Pont circa 1600, a mansion is depicted on the island, with the annotation: Loch Sesatut, sumtyms ye dwelling of ye chief man of Glenshy and Strathardle. In a map by Robert Gordon of Straloch circa 1636–1648, the building is noted as 'L. Sesatur old chief dwelling of Glens(hie). By 1747, all knowledge of the island had been forgotten.

See also
 List of lochs in Scotland

References

Beanie
Beanie
Tay catchment
Birdwatching sites in Scotland